Statistics of Primera División de México in season 1989–90.

Overview
It was contested by 20 teams, and Puebla won the championship.

Potros Neza was promoted from Segunda División, however, the team sold its license to Veracruz.

Atlante F.C. was relocated from Mexico City to Querétaro. The same team was relegated to Segunda División.

Teams

Group stage

Group 1

Group 2

Group 3

Group 4

Results

Playoff

Final

Puebla won 6-4 on aggregate.

Moves
After this season Querétaro bought the Tampico Madero franchise in order to come into Primera Division for the 1990-91 season.

References
Mexico - List of final tables (RSSSF)

Liga MX seasons
Mex
1989–90 in Mexican football